Lincoln Municipal Airport  is a public use airport located in Lincoln, a city in Benton County, Missouri, United States. It is owned by the City of Lincoln.

Facilities and aircraft 
Lincoln Municipal Airport covers an area of 17 acres (7 ha) at an elevation of 940 feet (287 m) above mean sea level. It has one runway designated 18/36 with a turf surface measuring 2,940 by 125 feet (896 x 38 m).

For the 12-month period ending July 1, 2010, the airport had 1,660 aircraft operations, an average of 138 per month: 96% general aviation and 4% military. At that time there were six single-engine aircraft based at this airport.

See also 
 List of airports in Missouri

References

External links 
 Lincoln Municipal Airport at Missouri DOT airport directory
 Aerial image as of March 1996 from USGS The National Map
 

Airports in Missouri
Buildings and structures in Benton County, Missouri
Transportation in Benton County, Missouri